Coleman Creek in San Diego County, California is a tributary of the San Diego River that arises at the top of the valley running southeasterly from Julian, at a saddle between two ridges of the Cuyamaca Mountains just south of Kentwood-In-The-Pines.  From there, Coleman Creek descends northwesterly down the valley to Julian, where it turns west, descending its canyon northwesterly through the site of Branson City, past the mouth of its tributary Eastwood Creek on the north, passing through the south end of Spencer Valley, past the mouth of its tributary Baily Creek on the north, then descending northwest down Quanai Canyon to its confluence with the San Diego River.

History
Coleman Creek was named for A. E. Coleman, who discovered gold in its waters in 1869, which led to the gold rush to the Cuyamaca Mountains and the founding of the gold mining camps of Coleman City, Branson City, Eastwood and the town of Julian.

References

Rivers of San Diego County, California
Cuyamaca Mountains
San Diego River
Rivers of Southern California